Ariel Behar and Gonzalo Escobar were the defending champions but chose not to defend their title.

Dustin Brown and Andrea Vavassori won the title after defeating Roman Jebavý and Adam Pavlásek 6–2, 6–2 in the final.

Seeds

Draw

References

External links
 Main draw

AON Open Challenger - Doubles
2022 Doubles